Denys Kostrzhevskyi (Денис Костржевский) (born 29 October 1968) is a Ukrainian businessman. As of early February 2022, he is the chairman of the board of Kyiv International Airport, and the president of the construction company Miskzhitlobud.

Between 1997 and 2006, Kostrzhevskyi was involved in Ukrainian politics, becoming an assistant in the Verkhovna Rada (Ukrainian parliament). From 1998 to 2002, he was an member of parliament for the Party of Greens of Ukraine. From 2001 to 2003, Kostrzhevskyi worked for the National Academy for Public Administration under the President of Ukraine.

References

External links 

 Official website

Living people
1968 births
Businesspeople from Kyiv
Party of Greens of Ukraine politicians